Edwin Fehrsen Woodhams (22 February 1880 – 8 February 1933) was an English cricketer.  Woodham's batting and bowling styles are unknown.  He was born at Seaford, Sussex.

Woodhams made a single first-class appearance for Sussex against Somerset at County Ground, Hove in the 1905 County Championship.  He was dismissed for a duck in Sussex's first-innings by Len Braund, while in their second-innings he ended unbeaten on 14 to guide Sussex to a 2 wicket win.  This was his only major appearance for Sussex.

He died at Withdean, Sussex on 8 February 1933.

References

External links
Edwin Woodhams at ESPNcricinfo
Edwin Woodhams at CricketArchive

1880 births
1933 deaths
People from Seaford, East Sussex
English cricketers
Sussex cricketers